The Plott Balsams are a mountain range in western North Carolina, in the southeastern United States.  They are part of the Blue Ridge Mountain Province of the Southern Appalachian Mountains.  The Plott Balsams stretch from the city of Sylva in the Tuckasegee River valley to the southwest to Maggie Valley in the northeast.  The Great Smoky Mountains border the Plott Balsams to the north and the Great Balsam Mountains border the range to the south.  The range comprises parts of Jackson County and Haywood County.

Four other summits in the range rise above 6,000 feet, namely  Mount Lyn Lowry,  Browning Knob,  Plott Balsam Mountain, and  Yellow Face. Other notable summits include the Pinnacle, which overlooks the Sylva area to the south,  Blackrock Mountain (near Yellow Face), and  Campbell Lick, which overlooks Maggie Valley.

The Blue Ridge Parkway traverses the slopes of the highest mountains in the Plott Balsam Range, connecting Soco Gap and Balsam Gap.  A short road connects the parkway to an overlook and a National Park Service visitor contact station and bookstore near the summit of Waterrock Knob.  The Nantahala National Forest protects much of the south side of the Plott Balsam Range.  The Qualla Boundary, which is the reservation for the Eastern Band of Cherokee Indians, includes parts of the range's northwest section along Soco Creek.  The city of Sylva maintains a municipal park along Fisher Creek in the southeast section of the range.  A memorial dedicated to leukemia victim Lyn Lowry, who died in 1962, is situated atop Lowry's namesake mountain.  The memorial includes a  cross that is lit up at night, making it visible for miles from the surrounding towns.  A stand of Southern Appalachian spruce-fir forest coats the range's upper elevations.

The Plott Balsams are named for the Plott family, whose ancestor, (Johannes) George Plott (c. 1733-1815), immigrated to North Carolina in the late 18th century from Germany.  The Plott Hound, a breed of hunting dog, is also named for the Plotts.

References and notes

External links
  
 Plott Balsams — Peakbagger.com
 South Beyond 6000 in the Plott Balsams — Carolina Mountain Club site
 Mount Lyn Lowry — SummitPost.org

Mountain ranges of North Carolina
Landforms of Jackson County, North Carolina
Landforms of Haywood County, North Carolina
Blue Ridge Mountains